DeBerg is a surname. Notable people with the surname include:

Keren DeBerg, American singer-songwriter
Steve DeBerg (born 1954), American football player

See also
de Burgh, surname
Dubourg, surname
Bourg (disambiguation)